Kal Parekh (Hindi: कल पारिख) is an Indian-American film and television actor best known for his starring role in the 2010 independent feature film, Karma Road and as Sanjeev, an Indian-American flight engineer in the ABC television series, Pan Am, set in the 1960s.

Early life
Parekh was born in India. In the late 1980s, his parents moved the family to the United States, settling in Verona, New Jersey. Parekh graduated from Verona High School. He next studied at and graduated from the School of Visual Arts (SVA) in New York City. While at SVA, Parekh produced an animated short that was screened at various film festivals. During his time at SVA, he learned to dance by watching music videos. Although self-taught, Parekh's talent for dancing enabled him to join dance troupes on both the west and east coasts of the United States.

He said,

Dancing liberated me, I was no longer an introverted individual, which I had been my whole life. Dancing came very naturally to me. I never took classes. It's something I just picked up and ended up being good at.

In 2002 he was cast in the first ever South Asian production on Broadway titled "Rang: Shades of my soul."  He went on to teach for four years at Arya Dance Academy. Parekh has said that dancing helped him to imagine acting.

Career
After graduating from SVA, Parekh took classes in live-action film at the New York Film Academy (NYFA). Soon after, he landed his first major role, as Shaheed in the Bollywood Hindi-language film, Khel Shuru. He learned Hindi for the part.

Parekh next was cast in several small roles in television series, including House, Entourage, Medium, and Royal Pains. A professional dancer, the  Parekh was cast as a featured dancer in the 2002 Bollywood film Kehtaa Hai Dil Baar Baar. In 2007, Parekh landed another Bollywood role in the feature film Ta Ra Rum Pum as the character Nilesh.

In 2010, Parekh had a lead role in the independent film Karma Road, as the character Ronick. Directed by Mihir Pathak, the film won the Silver Award for Best Feature Film at the 2010 Philadelphia Film Festival and the Gold Level Award for a feature film at the 2010 California Film Awards.

In early 2011, he was cast as Sanjeev in the ABC prime-time period drama Pan Am. He and the show were quite popular, especially in Europe, and won a Rose d'Or in 2012.

In 2013, he co-starred as Aaron on the FOX drama, The Following.

He recently completed filming a lead role in The Spectacular Jihad of Taz Raheem.

Parekh resides in Los Angeles.

References

External links
 
 

Year of birth missing (living people)
Living people
Male actors from New Jersey
American male film actors
American male television actors
Indian emigrants to the United States
People from Verona, New Jersey
Verona High School (New Jersey) alumni
New York Film Academy alumni
American people of Gujarati descent
American male actors of Indian descent